Queen's Park Arena is a 3,500 seat multi-use arena located within Queen's Park in New Westminster, British Columbia. 

The arena was built in 1930 and opened on September 19. In its time, the Queen's Park Arena hosted the New Westminster Bruins of the Western Hockey League and British Columbia Junior Hockey League teams the New Westminster Royals and the Royal City Outlaws. It hosted the New Westminster Lacrosse teams for more than 75 years, including the multi-Mann Cup champion New Westminster Salmonbellies of the Western Lacrosse Association, and has a wooden floor for lacrosse known for its green colour.

The arena was also home to the professional New Westminster Royals, which played in the Pacific Coast Hockey League from 1945 to 1952 and the Western Hockey League from 1952 to 1959. In 1949, team director Doug Grimston insisted on the continuation of a smoking ban at the arena, and stated that he would take financial responsibility for lost attendance.

The arena was used in the 2004 film Miracle, as the location of tryouts for the United States men's national ice hockey team in advance of the 1980 Winter Olympics.

References

Buildings and structures in New Westminster
Indoor arenas in British Columbia
Indoor ice hockey venues in Canada
Indoor lacrosse venues in Canada
Sports venues in British Columbia
Western Hockey League arenas